Vinai (stylizised as VINAI) is an Italian EDM production and DJ duo, formed in 2011 consisting of brothers Alessandro Vinai (born 25 January 1990) and Andrea Vinai (born 10 January 1994).

Career 

After working on individual projects, they formed Vinai. In 2013, they signed with Time Records before releasing the single "Hands Up". Vinai's collaborative single with Swedish DJs Error404 titled "Bullet" earned them higher recognition.

In 2014, they joined Spinnin' Records and released a single with Canadian DJs DVBBS titled "Raveology".

They performed at the 2015 Ultra Music Festival in Miami, Florida, as among the additional lineup. They also performed at Mysteryland in March 2015.

During 2017, they participated for the third consecutive year at Tomorrowland, and they founded their own record label named Zerothirty.

Discography

Singles

Remixes 
2012
 Pound The Alarm - Nicki Minaj
 Sexy And I Know It - LMFAO
 Te Quiero Mi Amor - DJ Samuel Kimk
 Me Gusta - Desaparecidos

2013
 Rain On My Shoulder - J. Nice and Frank Tedesco featuring Lil'Lee
 RocknnRolla - Bestfors featuring Manu LJ

2014
 Sasha Gray - DJ KUBA and Neitan
 Miami - Niels Van Gogh featuring Princess Superstar
 Escape With Me - DJ Kuba and Neitan vs. Cherry featuring Jonny Rose
 Loco - Joel Fletcher and Seany B
 Horizon - Kid Massive and Databoy
 Unstoppable - R3hab featuring Eva Simons
 Soundwave - R3hab featuring Trevor Guthrie

2015
 What I Did For Love - David Guetta featuring Emeli Sandé
 Nova - Dimitri Vegas & Like Mike vs. Tujamo and Felguk
 Neon Future - Steve Aoki featuring Luke Steele of Empire of the Sun
 Keep Shining - Redfoo

2017
 Paris - The Chainsmokers

2019
 Cold - Boy In Space and Unheard

Awards and nominations

DJ Magazine top 100 DJs

References

External links
Official website

Italian DJs
Italian electronic music groups
DJ duos
Electronic dance music duos
Year of birth missing (living people)
Sibling musical duos
Male musical duos